West Beach is a suburb of Esperance, a town in south-eastern Western Australia south of Esperance's central business district, extending southwesterly for several kilometres along the southern coast. Its local government area is the Shire of Esperance.

The suburb was gazetted in 1971.

Demographics
West Beach residents had a median age of 39, which was higher than the regional average, and the median individual income was $591 per week compared with $454 per week in the Esperance region. 2.3% of residents identified as Indigenous Australians.

References

Suburbs of Esperance, Western Australia
Beaches of Western Australia